Douglas County is a county located in the U.S. state of Colorado. As of the 2020 Census, the population was 357,978. The county is named in honor of U.S. Senator Stephen A. Douglas. The county seat is Castle Rock.

Douglas County is part of the Denver-Aurora-Lakewood metropolitan statistical area. It is located midway between Colorado's two largest cities, Denver and Colorado Springs, and contains a portion of Aurora, the state's third-largest city. Douglas County has the highest median household income of any Colorado county or statistical equivalent. It is ranked seventh nationally in that category.

Overview
Douglas County is lightly wooded, mostly with ponderosa pine, with broken terrain characterized by mesas, foothills, and small streams. Cherry Creek and Plum Creek rise in Douglas County and flow north toward Denver and into the South Platte River. Both were subject to flash flooding in the past, Plum Creek being partially responsible for the Denver flood of 1965.  Cherry Creek and Plum Creek are now dammed.

Most residents commute to workplaces elsewhere in the metropolitan area outside of the county. Suburban development is supplementing the traditional ranching economy of the county.

History
Douglas County was one of the original 17 counties created in the Colorado Territory by the Colorado Territorial Legislature on November 1, 1861. The county was named in honor of U.S. Senator Stephen A. Douglas of Illinois, who died five months before the county was created. The county seat was originally Franktown, but was moved to California Ranch in 1863, and then to Castle Rock in 1874. Although the county's boundaries originally extended eastward to the Kansas state border, in 1874, most of the eastern portion of the county became part of Elbert County.

Geography

Adjacent counties
Jefferson County, Colorado – west
Arapahoe County, Colorado – north
Elbert County, Colorado – east
El Paso County, Colorado – south
Teller County, Colorado – southwest

Major highways
  Interstate 25
  U.S. Highway 85
  U.S. Highway 87
  State Highway 67
  State Highway 83
  State Highway 86
  State Highway 105
  State Highway 121
  State Highway 470
  E-470 tollway

Parks and recreational areas
Three state parks fall within Douglas County: Castlewood Canyon State Park, Chatfield State Park and Roxborough State Park. Parts of the county lie within the Pike National Forest and were crossed by the historic South Platte Trail.

Recreation trails in the county include:
American Discovery Trail
Colorado Trail
Devils Head National Recreation Trail
Highline Canal National Recreation Trail
Platte River Greenway National Recreation Trail
Ridgeline Open Space Trail
Bluffs Regional Park Trail

The Rueter–Hess Reservoir, when filled, may provide significant recreation, including fishing, hiking, and nonmotorized boating. If filled to capacity, surface size would be 1,140 acres, making this a fairly significant reservoir in Colorado and Douglas County's largest body of water.

Demographics

As of the census of 2000,  175,766 people, 60,924 households, and 49,835 families were  residing in the county. The population density was 209 people per square mile (81/km2). The 63,333 housing units averaged 75 per square mile (29/km2). The racial makeup of the county was 92.77% White, 2.51% Asian, 0.95%  African American, 0.41% Native American,  1.49% from other races, and 1.88% from two or more races. Hispanics or Latinos of any race made up 5.06% of the population.

Of the 60,924 households,  47.2% had children under the age of 18 living with them, 73.8% were married couples living together, 5.7% had a female householder with no husband present, and 18.2% were not families. About 13.3% of all households were made up of individuals, and 1.9% had someone living alone who was 65 years of age or older. The average household size was 2.88, and the average family size was 3.19.

In the county, the population distribution was 31.6% under the age of 18, 4.8% from 18 to 24, 37.9% from 25 to 44, 21.6% from 45 to 64, and 4.2% who were 65 years of age or older. The median age was 34 years. For every 100 females, there were 99.7 males. For every 100 females age 18 and over, there were 97.4 males.

The median income for a household in the county was $82,929, and for a family was $88,482 (these figures had risen to $93,819 and $102,767, respectively, as of a 2007 estimate). Males had a median income of $60,729 versus $38,965 for females. The per capita income for the county was $34,848. About 1.6% of families and 2.1% of the population were below the poverty line, including 1.9% of those under age 18 and 3.7% of those age 65 or over.

Douglas County had the highest median household income of any Colorado county or statistical equivalent in 2000. In 2008, it ranked eighth in the United States in that category; it was one of two in the top 15 not in the vicinity of New York or Washington.

Health and longevity
In 2021, Douglas County was judged by the U.S. News & World Report to be the second healthiest of 3,143 counties and county-equivalents of the United States based on 84 different factors. Residents of the county lived 84.0 years on the average compared to the U.S. average of 77.5 years.

Politics
As a primarily exurban county, Douglas County has long been known as a Republican stronghold. In the 2012 election, Mitt Romney won 62% of the vote. Douglas County has become more competitive in recent years due to educated white voters leaving the Republican Party, with Donald Trump winning 55% of the county's vote in 2016, and only 52% of the vote in 2020. However, Democratic strength is mostly limited to northern Douglas County, including Highlands Ranch, Lone Tree, and Meridian, while the rest of the county is still strongly Republican.

Education
Douglas County is served by Douglas County School District RE-1, the third-largest school district in Colorado. In addition to traditional neighborhood schools, the district includes sixteen charter schools, four option schools, and an online school . Schools are rated generally high in the area.

The University Center at Chaparral in Parker offers courses through Arapahoe Community College, University of Colorado Denver, University College of the University of Denver, and the Douglas County School District. The University of Phoenix has a campus in Lone Tree.

The University of Colorado offers courses from both its Boulder campus  and its Denver campus at the CU-South Extension in Lone Tree.

Libraries
The Douglas County Libraries system has seven branches throughout the county. The library also houses the Douglas County History Research Center, which collects and preserves the history of Douglas County, the High Plains, the Divide area of the Front Range and the State of Colorado, to provide historical research resources to the public.

Economy

Top employers

According to the county's 2015 Comprehensive Annual Financial Report, the top employers in the county are:

Recognition
Douglas County has been recognized by a number of national periodicals:
 Money magazine ranked Douglas County number five in the United States for “Job Growth over the Last Eight Years”, 18 August 2009 
 American City Business Journals (ACBJ) ranked Douglas County fourth in the nation for “Quality of Life”,  May 2004 
SchoolDigger.com ranked Douglas County School District at number one in the Denver metropolitan area and number 12 in Colorado based on 2009 test scores.  (School district rankings were determined by averaging the rankings of individual schools within each of the 122 districts evaluated.)

Communities

Cities
Aurora (part)
Castle Pines (Castle Pines North)
Littleton (part)
Lone Tree

Towns

 Castle Rock

Larkspur
Parker

Census-designated places 

Acres Green
Carriage Club (former)
Castle Pines Village
Cottonwood (former)
Franktown
Grand View Estates
Heritage Hills (former)
Highlands Ranch
Louviers
Meridian
Meridian Village
Perry Park
Roxborough Park
Sedalia
Sierra Ridge
Stepping Stone
Sterling Ranch
Stonegate
The Pinery
Westcreek

Other unincorporated communities 
Dakan
Deckers
Greenland

See also

Outline of Colorado
Index of Colorado-related articles
Colorado census statistical areas
Denver-Aurora-Boulder Combined Statistical Area
Front Range Urban Corridor
National Register of Historic Places listings in Douglas County, Colorado
Douglas County search and rescue

References

External links
Douglas County website Douglas County Website
Douglas County School Information Douglas County Schools
Douglas County Sheriff Department website DCSO
DCSO Recruiting website Join DCSO
YourHub.com/DouglasCounty Web Archived Website 
Colorado Historical Society Colorado Historical Society
Colorado County Evolution by Don Stanwyck
Douglas County Libraries Douglas County Libraries
DCL Archives & Local History DCL Archives & Local History
Our Douglas County Colorado News and Events - Web Archived Website

 

 
Colorado counties
1861 establishments in Colorado Territory
Populated places established in 1861